"Light Surrounding You" is the second single by alternative rock band, Evermore, taken from their second studio album, Real Life (June 2006). It was written by Dann Hume, the group's drummer. The record is co-produced by Jon Hume. The song was released in October 2006 and peaked at No. 15 on the RIANZ Singles Chart in New Zealand and number one on the ARIA Singles Chart, making it Evermore's most successful single in Australia. It was the first single by a New Zealand artist to top the Australian charts since "How Bizarre" by OMC in 1996.

Dann Hume explained that the song is about "someone who had all the potential in the world but they didn’t believe in themselves". The music video features Australian actress Emily Browning. The song was used as a tribute to the leaving of Home and Aways long-term character Sally, portrayed by Kate Ritchie, in the 2006 season finale. It was earlier used for the Channel Ten series premiere of American show, Jericho. In New Zealand it was used in TV One's on-air identity package.

Background
The song was released on 14 October 2006 from their second album, Real Life, which was earlier released on the Warner label on 8 July 2006. The single peaked at No. 15 on the RIANZ Singles Chart in New Zealand. Drummer Dann Hume composed much of the music for the song on a piano. It reached No. 1 on the ARIA Singles Chart in their adopted country of Australia. It was the second song released from the album; whilst "Light Surrounding You" became Evermore's first number-one single in Australia, their first single "Running" remained their highest-charting New Zealand hit.

Track listing

Music video
 Official Version:
 Channel Seven Version: Channel Seven released the song as a tribute video for Kate Ritchie's character Sally Fletcher.

Personnel
Jon Hume – vocals, lead and rhythm guitars
Peter Hume – piano, keyboards, bass guitar, backing vocals
Dann Hume – drums, rhythm and acoustic guitars, backing vocals

Charts

Weekly charts

Year-end charts

Release history

See also
List of number-one singles in Australia in 2007

References

Evermore (band) songs
2006 singles
Number-one singles in Australia
Songs written by Jon Hume
Songs written by Dann Hume
2006 songs
Warner Music Australasia singles